V-League 2004 was the 48th season of Vietnam's professional football league. Kinh Do was the league's sponsor, replacing PepsiCo.

Hoàng Anh Gia Lai won their second title in this season.

League table

References

External links
Vietnam Football Federation

Vietnamese Super League seasons
Vietnam
Vietnam
1